Saint-Pierre-Quiberon is a commune in the Morbihan department of Brittany in north-western France. The commune occupies the northern part of the Quiberon peninsula, that it shares with the commune of Quiberon. Residents of Saint-Pierre-Quiberon, numbering 2,060 in 2017, are called Saint-Pierrois.

Politics and administration

Monuments
Fort Penthièvre dates from the 19th century.

Transport
There are four railway stations in the commune of Saint-Pierre-Quiberon, all on the Auray–Quiberon railway which is operated in summer only: Saint-Pierre-Quiberon, Kerhostin, L'Isthme and Penthièvre. At Auray station connections to Paris and other places in France are offered.

See also
Communes of the Morbihan department

References

External links

Official website 

 Mayors of Morbihan Association 

Saintpierrequiberon